Montreux II is a live album by jazz pianist Bill Evans with Eddie Gómez and Marty Morell, recorded at the Montreux Jazz Festival in Switzerland in 1970 and released on the CTI label. The album was the second of Evans' Montreux concert recordings to be released, following the Grammy Award-winning Bill Evans at the Montreux Jazz Festival (1968).

Reception
The Allmusic review by Ken Dryden awarded the album 3½ stars and stated, "While this is a terrific live performance, there are sound problems, including what sounds like bleeding of the stage monitors into the mix, and there are muddy spots in the recording as well".

Track listing
All compositions by Bill Evans except as indicated
 Introduction - 1:11
 "Very Early" - 5:27
 "Alfie" (Burt Bacharach, Hal David) - 5:30
 "34 Skidoo" - 6:37
 "How My Heart Sings" (Earl Zindars) - 4:16
 "Israel" (John Carisi) - 4:14
 "I Hear a Rhapsody" (Jack Baker, George Fragos, Dick Gasparre) - 5:54
 "Peri's Scope" - 6:00
Recorded at the Montreux Jazz Festival, Casino De Montreux, Switzerland on June 19 & 20, 1970.

Personnel
Bill Evans - piano
Eddie Gómez - bass
Marty Morell - drums

References

Bill Evans live albums
Albums recorded at the Montreux Jazz Festival
1970 live albums
CTI Records live albums